Inspector Gadget and the Circus of Fear is a video game based on the television show of the same name.

Plot
When the International Circus comes to town, a mysterious series of disappearances begin, and Inspector Gadget is called into help. Once his involvement is discovered, Penny and Brain are kidnapped, making Gadget's task bigger. He must get through each side-scrolling level, avoiding the meanies by jumping on them to reach the final target. There are many holes which lead to different sections of levels. The C64 version adds an icon system allowing players to collect and use their gadgets.

External links

 

1987 video games
Video games based on Inspector Gadget
Commodore 64 games
Video games about police officers
Video games developed in France
ZX Spectrum games
Multiplayer and single-player video games